Census Division No. 17 (Dauphin) is a census division located within the Parklands Region of the province of Manitoba, Canada. Unlike in some other provinces, census divisions do not reflect the organization of local government in Manitoba. These areas exist solely for the purposes of statistical analysis and presentation; they have no government of their own.

The economic base of the area is primarily agriculture with some manufacturing and food processing. The population of the division at the 2006 census was 22,358. The division is geographically centred on the city of Dauphin and Dauphin Lake, and contains most of Riding Mountain National Park. Also included in the division is the Ebb and Flow First Nation.This region in located in central Manitoba.

Demographics 

Cities

 Dauphin

Unincorporated communities
 Ethelbert
 Gilbert Plains
 Grandview
 McCreary
 Ste. Rose du Lac
 Winnipegosis

Municipalities
Alonsa
Dauphin
Ethelbert
Gilbert Plains
Grandview
Lakeshore
McCreary
Mossey River
Ste. Rose

Reserves
 Ebb and Flow 52

Unorganized areas
 Unorganized Division No. 17

References

External links
 Manotba Community Profiles: Dauphin

17